Ronald W. Ellis (born March 10, 1960 in Glendale, California) is an American Thoroughbred horse racing trainer. A November 8, 1997 Los Angeles Times article noted that he "is known for taking his time with horses and taking special care with those prone to injury."

Ron Ellis only saw his first live Thoroughbred horse race at age sixteen but was immediately "hooked" on the sport. Four years later he was training horses and earned his first win with To B. Or Not who won the 1980 Carlsbad Stakes at Del Mar Racetrack and then captured that year's  Palos Verdes Handicap plus back-to-back wins in the 1981-1982 El Conejo Handicap. A difficult horse to handle, To B. Or Not set two track records in three years of racing for Ellis who went on to train for prominent owners such as Pam and Martin Wygod, B. Wayne Hughes, and the Mace Siegel family's Jay Em Ess Stable.

In 2004, Ellis trained Declan's Moon to an undefeated season and American Champion Two-Year-Old Colt honors. In 2009, he won the most important race of his career when Rail Trip captured the Grade I Hollywood Gold Cup.

Ron Ellis serves on the board of directors of the Thoroughbred Owners of California (TOC). He and wife Amy, with whom he has three daughters, make their home in Arcadia, California near Santa Anita Park. Amy McGee Ellis is the sister of trainer Paul McGee.

He was once an analyst for Fox Sports from 1998-2001. He has been with TVG Network since 2006.

References

1960 births
Living people
American horse trainers
Sportspeople from Glendale, California
American horse racing announcers
People from Arcadia, California